Jayantha Paranathala (born 24 November 1950, in Pannipitiya) is a former Sri Lankan cricketer and Deputy Inspector General of Police. He was also a former vice president of Sri Lanka Cricket, and a former national cricket selector.

Cricket career

Jayantha started playing cricket at Isipathana College, Colombo. As a schoolboy in 1977, he was selected to play against England B at Galle.

Post-playing career

Paranathala had a long career in the Sri Lanka Police and retired with the rank of Deputy Inspector General of Police.

Paranathala served Sri Lanka Cricket in various capacities including Sri Lanka team manager, national selector, Sri Lanka Cricket Vice President, Chairman of the Umpires' Committee, Secretary of the National Development Committee.

He has been the President of cricket club Burgher Recreation Club since 1988. In September 2018, he was one of 49 former Sri Lankan cricketers honoured by Sri Lanka Cricketfor their services before Sri Lanka became a full member of the International Cricket Council (ICC).

References

External links 
Jayantha Paranathala appointed JP | The Sundaytimes Sri Lanka
Jayantha Paranthala profile and biography, stats, records, averages, photos and videos at ESPNcricinfo
http://www.dailynews.lk/?q=sports/jayantha-paranathala-national-cricketer-and-fine-administrator
http://www.sundayobserver.lk/2014/10/12/spo22.asp

1950 births
Living people
Alumni of Isipathana College